Karl Novelich (1852 - 1897), also known as Karlo or Dragutin Novelich, was a Bulgarian voivode during the Kresna–Razlog uprising, mayor of Plovdiv and participant in the murder of Anna Simon, one of the most infamous affairs during the late 1890s Bulgaria.

Biography 
Novelich's early life is enigmatic - he claimed that he born in 1852 in Vicenza, was of Croatian extraction, and that he fought alongside Giuseppe Garibaldi. According to others, he might've originated from Piedmont or Friuli.

When the Kresna–Razlog uprising blew up, under the name of Dragutin Novelich, he led a detachment which, along with those of Georgi Karaiskaki, Pavle Yankov, Grigor Ognenov, Stefo Nikolov, Georgi Pulevski, Kosta Nikolov, Nikolitsa Makedonski, Georgi Oko and Konstantin Plevakov, invaded Macedonia.

After the uprising, Novelich settled in Plovdiv and eventually became its mayor. In 1897, he helped the palatial adjutant Dechko Boychev in the murder of his lover, the Hungarian prostitute Anna Simon. For this crime, he was sentenced to death and executed.

References 

1852 births
1897 deaths
Mayors of Plovdiv
Bulgarian revolutionaries
Executed politicians
Croatian revolutionaries
Bulgarian people convicted of murder
Croatian people convicted of murder
Executed Bulgarian people
Executed Croatian people
People from Vicenza